Stormy Weather is the debut studio album by Australian singer, Grace Knight. Released in September 1991 it peaked at number 16 on the ARIA Charts and was certified platinum.

At the ARIA Music Awards of 1992, the album was nominated for ARIA Award for Best Adult Contemporary Album.

Track listing

Charts

Weekly charts

Year-end charts

Certifications

References

1991 albums